Rear Admiral Sinsy Ndeshi Bamba Nghipandua is a retired Namibian military officer whose last appointment served was as the Commander of the Namibian Navy. He was appointed the Commander of the Namibian Navy in 2017. Prior to that he served as Commander of Naval Operations with the rank of Rear Admiral.

Career

Exile
Admiral Ngipandua joined People's Liberation Army of Namibia under SWAPO in exile in 1978 as a 17 year old teenager and received military training in the Soviet Union, Yugoslavia and Cuba.

NDF career
Rear Admiral Nghipandua's career in the Namibian Defence Force started in 1990 as a captain after Namibia's independence when he was appointed as a Staff Officer 3 Military Intelligence Branch DHQ in the Namibian Army. In 1995 he attended the Naval Surface Warfare Course Brazil. In 2000 he was attached to the Brazilian Navy as a ship captain under instruction as an Executive Officer. Nghipandua became the first Namibian Ship Commanding Officer as he was appointed as captain of the Patrol Vessel NPV Oryx in 2002 with the rank of Commander. In 2005 he was appointed as the Commanding Officer of the Naval Base Capt (N) P.N. Sacharia with the rank of Navy Captain. In 2009 he was appointed as the Commander Naval Operations with the rank of Rear Admiral (JG).In 2017 he rose to the rank of Rear Admiral and appointed as Navy Commander he served in that position until his retirement in August 2020.

Qualifications
Command and Staff Course and NDC programme in Kenya in 2008
 Naval Senior Staff Course in USA
 Naval Officers Formative Course in Brazil
 Junior Staff Course (BMATT)
 Recce Training in Lubango, Angola
 Intelligence and Special Operations in Cuba
 Counter Intelligence
 Advance military Law

He also holds a:
Bachelor of Technology in Business Administration from the University of South Africa
National Diploma in public administration from the then Polytechnic of Namibia.
Postgraduate Diploma in National Security and Strategic Studies from the United States Naval Staff College

Military Decorations
  Namibian Army Pioneer Medal
  Independence Medal
 Meritorious Services (10) years’ services medal
  NDF Commendation Medal
The Naval Merit Order
The Namibian Navy Achievement Medal
The Sea Services 250 days Medal
The ten (10) years (Navy) Meritorious Services Medal
The Namibian Navy Pioneer Medal
The Silver Star Medal
The Southern Cross Medal

References

Living people
Namibian military personnel
1960 births